Monaco–Spain relations are the bilateral relations between Monaco and Spain. Monaco has an embassy in Madrid Spain is accredited to Monaco from its embassy in Paris, France.

Diplomatic relations 

In 1876, King Alfonso XIII authorized the creation of a legation of the Principality of Monaco in Madrid. Since then, the Principality maintained its representation continuously in the capital of Spain until, in the decade of the 30s and as a consequence of the Spanish civil war and after the world war, the legation was closed.

In 1996, Monaco opened an Embassy in Madrid, and currently the Principality of Monaco is represented in Spain through a resident Ambassador in Madrid.

Spain appointed Carlos Bastarreche as the first Ambassador in Monaco with residence in Paris in November 2013, which was succeeded by Ramón de Miguel on 1 August 2014.

Treaties and Agreements 
 Exchange of notes on the abolition of the mandatory passport to facilitate tourism between Spain and Monaco, from 13 April to 26 June 1978.
 European Extradition Convention (No. 24 of the Council of Europe) of 13 December 1957. It was ratified by Monaco on 30 January 2009 and entered into force on 1 May 2009. Spain ratified it on 7 May 1982 .

See also
 Foreign relations of Monaco
 Foreign relations of Spain

References

 
Spain
Monaco